Beehive Mill is a Grade II* listed former cotton mill in the district of Ancoats, Greater Manchester, England. It is located at (grid reference ) on a site surrounded by Radium Street, Jersey Street, Bengal Street and Naval Street.

The building was constructed in three phases, the first two being in the early 1820s with the third phase being added in 1847. The second phase, built in 1824 and used as warehousing, is an important example of early fireproof construction. The roof of the 1824 warehouse belonging to Beehive Mill is the only known surviving example in Manchester of an advanced form of mill roof using cast and wrought iron, and which was prefabricated. The third phase was five storeys high and built along Bengal Street; this block was damaged by fire and partially rebuilt in 1861. The estimated value of the damage caused was £25,000.

The adjacent Bengal Street block was destroyed by fire in July 2005. The fire threatened to destroy the rest of the complex, which housed Sankeys nightclub and offices. In an effort to extinguish the fire, water was pumped from the nearby Rochdale Canal. This site is now developed as residential.

In 2002, the upper floor of the building was used as a filming location in the film 24 Hour Party People, taking on the role of the Factory Records offices.

In 2017 Beehive Mill was sold to Urban Splash. It has been redeveloped as office and a luxury coworking space.

See also

Grade II* listed buildings in Greater Manchester
Listed buildings in Manchester-M4

References

Bibliography

Textile mills in Manchester
Cotton mills
Former textile mills in the United Kingdom
Brick buildings and structures
Buildings and structures completed in 1820
1820 establishments in England
Grade II* listed buildings in Manchester
Grade II* listed industrial buildings